Pensby and Thingwall is a Wirral Metropolitan Borough Council Ward in the Wirral West Parliamentary constituency.

Councillors

Election results

Elections of the 2020s

Elections of the 2010s

May 2019

May 2018

May 2016

May 2015

May 2014

February 2013

May 2012

May 2011

May 2010

Elections of the 2000s

May 2008

May 2007

May 2006

June 2004

Notes
• italics denotes the sitting councillor • bold denotes the winning candidate

References

Wards of Merseyside
Politics of the Metropolitan Borough of Wirral
Wards of the Metropolitan Borough of Wirral